Ramon Bejarano (born July 17, 1969) is an American prelate of the Roman Catholic Church, serving as auxiliary bishop for the Diocese of San Diego in California since 2020.

Biography

Early life 
Ramon Bejarano was born in Seagraves, Texas on July 17, 1969. Soon after his birth, Bejarano's family moved to Juan Aldama, Chihuahua in Mexico.  In 1987, when he was 18, the family moved to Tracy, California. Bejarano worked in Tracy sorting tomatoes and as a hotel janitor.

At age 20, Bejarano applied to become a seminarian with the Diocese of Stockton.  Bejarano then entered the Diocesan Seminary of Tijuana in Tijuana, Mexico, earning a Master of Philosophy degree.  He received a Master of Divinity degree from Mount Angel Abbey in Saint Benedict, Oregon.

Priesthood 
On August 15, 1998, Bejarano was ordained to the priesthood by Bishop Donald Montrose. Bejarano is incardinated in the Diocese of Stockton. After his ordination, Bejarano served as parochial vicar in St. George Parish in Stockton, California, and Sacred Heart Parish in Turlock, California. When Holy Family Parish was founded in Modesto, California, Bejarano server there.  In 2005, he became pastor of St. Stanislaus Parish in Modesto, serving there for the next 11 years.  In 2019, Bejarano was named pastor of the Cathedral of the Annunciation Parish in Stockton.

During his tenure in the California Central Valley, Bejarano served as chaplain to the Migrant Ministry, celebrating mass for families and workers in migrant camps, providing the sacraments and counseling. He served as the spiritual director for the Spanish Catholic Radio in the area. His leadership positions in the diocese included membership on the Presbyteral Council, the Diaconate Board, the Preparatory Commission for the Diocesan Synod of 2005, and the College of Consultors.

Auxiliary Bishop of San Diego
Pope Francis appointed Bejarano as auxiliary bishop for the Diocese of San Diego and titular bishop of Carpi on February 27, 2020.  His consecration, initially scheduled for April 21, 2020, was postponed due to the COVID-19 pandemic.  He was consecrated on July 14, 2020, by Bishop Robert W. McElroy in a liturgy celebrated in English, Spanish, and Latin.

See also

 Catholic Church hierarchy
 Catholic Church in the United States
 Historical list of the Catholic bishops of the United States
 List of Catholic bishops of the United States
 Lists of patriarchs, archbishops, and bishops

References

External links
Roman Catholic Diocese of San Diego Official Site

 
 

1969 births
Living people
People from Laredo, Texas
21st-century Roman Catholic bishops in the United States
American people of Mexican descent
Bishops appointed by Pope Francis